Skerry is a hamlet in the town of Brandon in Franklin County, New York, United States. It is located east of the Little Salmon River on Franklin County Highway 12 (Skerry Road) and Franklin County Highway 13 (Bangor Skerry Road).

Originally, the community developed around a lumber mill and other small businesses.   To the north of Skerry are a number of farms, while to the south are the foothills of the Adirondack Mountains and extensive hardwood and softwood forests that are part of the Deer River State Forests.

History
Skerry developed in the mid to late 19th century, serving the farms to the north and as a small hamlet with a number of small industries. The Bowen Sawmill operated for more than thirty years (see the account by Mrs. Alice Crooks, daughter of L. Cass Bowen, in an oral history interview in 1970).  

The Bowen Mill also had its own logging camps to support their sawmill and employed both mill workers and loggers during its existence. In 1920, Reynolds Bros. bought the lumber mill and operated it until 1926 when the dam washed out.

References
 Historical Sketches of Franklin County And Its Several Towns, Seaver, Frederick J. (1918), J.B Lyons Company, Albany, NY (Chapter VIII:  Brandon).

Hamlets in New York (state)
Hamlets in Franklin County, New York